I'm So Lonely may refer to:

 "I'm So Lonely" (The Beach Boys song)
 "I'm So Lonely" (Cast song)